was a World War II Imperial Japanese Navy officer.

Early life and education
He was born in Kagoshima prefecture  in Mansei city (now Minamisatuma city). He graduated from Tachikawa junior high school and entered the Japanese Naval Academy on August 26, 1920, graduating on July 14, 1923.

In Rabaul
When he was the commander of a unit in Rabaul on New Britain he suggested modifying the ordnance fitment of the Nakajima J1N as a night fighter, which by 21 May 1943 was successful against B-24s and B-17s, although less so against B-29s.

1945
He was in command of Atsugi Aerodrome during the latter part of the Second World War, and initially refused to surrender. They printed leaflets and dropped them over the Kanto area calling for the war to be continued "to the end". Finally, 33 pilots left the base, and Douglas MacArthur arrived there on August 30.

Kozono was weakened by malaria and was arrested by the Japanese Navy. He was then taken to court martial, stripped of rank, and sentenced to life imprisonment. He was released on parole in 1950 and was pardoned in 1952. He ended his life as a farmer after release.

References

1902 births
1960 deaths
Japanese military personnel of World War II
Military personnel from Kagoshima Prefecture